The 2020 Russian Women's World Qualification Event was held from February 14 to 16 in Sochi, Russia at the Ice Cube Curling Center. The event was used to select the team that was supposed to represent Russia at the 2020 World Women's Curling Championship at the CN Centre in Prince George, British Columbia. However, the World Championships were cancelled due to the COVID-19 pandemic.

Two teams were selected to compete in the event: Team Alina Kovaleva from Saint Petersburg and Team Anna Sidorova (team of various clubs). The competition was held in a best of seven series with a team needing to win four matches to win. The Alina Kovaleva rink won the series 4–1 over the Sidorova rink. The games were broadcast on Russian Curling TV's YouTube Channel. The commentator of the series of qualifying matches was two-time world champion (in mixed doubles and mixed teams) Anastasia Bryzgalova.

Teams

Standings

Results
All matches times are listed in Moscow Time (UTC+03:00).

Draw 1
Friday, February 14, 4:30 pm

Draw 2
Saturday, February 15, 9:00 am

Draw 3
Saturday, February 15, 4:30 pm

Draw 4
Sunday, February 16, 9:00 am

Draw 5
Sunday, February 16, 4:30 pm

Sidorova only played with three players.

References

Curling competitions in Russia
2020 in women's curling
Sports competitions in Sochi
2020 in Russian women's sport
February 2020 sports events in Russia